The voiced bilabial plosive or stop is a type of consonantal sound used in many spoken languages. The voiced bilabial stop occurs in English, and it is the sound denoted by the letter  in obey  (obeI).

Features

Features of the voiced bilabial stop:

Varieties

Occurrence

See also
 Betacism
 List of phonetics topics

Notes

References

External links
 

Voiced oral consonants
Bilabial stops
Pulmonic consonants
Labial–coronal consonants